= Baer Philippsthal =

German Jewish author

Dov Baer ben Shraga Philippsthal (Hebrew: דב בר בן שרגא פיליפסטל) was a German Jewish author, who lived in Berlin at the beginning of the nineteenth century. He wrote Naḥale Devash (Berlin, 1832), which contains extracts from various Hebrew books dealing mainly with philosophical and ethical subjects.

== Publications ==
- Naḥale Devash [Streams of Honey]. 880-03Nahạle devash. Berlin: Itzek Levent. 1832.
